Izabella is a Polish feminine given name. Notable people with the name include:
Izabella Alvarez (born 2004), American actress
Izabella Antonowicz (born 1942), Polish sprint canoer
Izabella Elżbieta Czartoryska (1832–1899), Polish noble lady
Izabella Miko (born 1981), Polish actress and model
Izabella Poniatowska (1730–1808), Polish noblewoman
Izabella Scorupco (born 1970), Polish-Swedish actress
Izabella Sierakowska (1946–2021), Polish politician
Izabella St. James (born 1975), American writer and actress

See also
 Isabella (given name)

Polish feminine given names